Thora Birch (born March 11, 1982) is an American actress and producer. She made her feature film debut in 1988 with a starring role in Purple People Eater, for which she received a Young Artist Award for "Best Young Actress Under Nine Years of Age". Birch rose to prominence as a child star during the 1990s with a string of notable appearances in films such as Paradise, All I Want for Christmas (both 1991), Patriot Games (1992), Hocus Pocus (1993), Monkey Trouble (1994), Now and Then (1995), and Alaska (1996). Her breakthrough into adult-oriented roles came at the end of that decade, when she earned a BAFTA nomination for Best Supporting Actress for her portrayal of Jane Burnham in American Beauty (1999).

Birch received further acclaim with her starring role as Enid in the cult hit Ghost World (2001), for which she earned several accolades including a Golden Globe nomination for Best Actress. In 2003, Birch received an Emmy Award nomination for playing the title role in the television film Homeless to Harvard: The Liz Murray Story. Her other film credits include Dungeons & Dragons (2000), The Hole (2001), Silver City (2004), Dark Corners (2006), Winter of Frozen Dreams (2009), and Petunia (2012). She has collaborated on three occasions with director Phillip Noyce:  Patriot Games, Clear and Present Danger (1994), and Above Suspicion (2019).

Birch took a break from acting between 2012 and 2016, but has since had parts in several independent features, such as The Last Black Man in San Francisco (2019). From 2019–2020, she played the role of Gamma / Mary on the tenth season of AMC's The Walking Dead.

In 2022, Birch made her directorial debut with The Gabby Petito Story for Lifetime.

Early life 
Birch was born in Los Angeles to Jack Birch and Carol Connors, former pornographic film actors who both appeared in the film Deep Throat.  She is of German-Jewish, Scandinavian, French-Canadian and Italian ancestry. Her forename is derived from that of Norse god of thunder and lightning, "Thor", which would have been her name if she had been born a boy. She has a younger brother, Bolt Birch.

Because of their own experience with the entertainment industry, Birch's parents were reluctant to encourage her to act, but were persuaded to show Birch's photograph to agents by a babysitter who noticed her imitating commercials. Birch got her first big break at the age of four, when the babysitter accompanied her to a successful audition for a Quaker Oats commercial.

Career

1980s 
Birch appeared in commercials in the late 1980s for Burger King, California Raisins, Quaker Oats (alongside Wilford Brimley), and Vlasic Pickles. She made her film debut in the 1988 science-fiction comedy Purple People Eater, for which she won a Youth In Film Award and a Young Artist Award in the category of "Best Young Actress Under Nine Years of Age". Also in 1988, she guest-starred in an episode of Doogie Howser, M.D., and was cast as Molly in the NBC television series Day By Day, being credited as "Thora". The show aired for two seasons on NBC and earned her two Young Artist Award nominations.

1990s
In 1990, Birch had one of the lead roles in the sitcom Parenthood, based on the 1989 film of the same name. It aired on NBC and was cancelled after one season. In the next year, she starred in the drama Paradise, with Don Johnson, Melanie Griffith and Elijah Wood. She won her role over more than 4,000 other young hopefuls who auditioned for it. Roger Ebert felt she played her part with "strong, simple charm" and later earned another Young Artist Award nomination. For the rest of the 1990s, Birch continued to find steady recognition as a child and teen actress through leading parts in numerous comedy and family feature films.

In 1991, she starred with Ethan Embry in the comedy All I Want for Christmas, as a girl who plans to get her divorced parents back together for Christmas. The film developed a following on television and on home video in subsequent years. In 1992, she played the daughter of Jack Ryan (Harrison Ford) in the spy thriller Patriot Games, which was a commercial success, grossing US$178 million at the worldwide box office.

At 11 years old, Birch appeared in the fantasy comedy Hocus Pocus (1993), opposite Bette Midler, Kathy Najimy and Sarah Jessica Parker. The film saw her play the younger sister of a teenage boy who inadvertently resurrects a villainous trio of witches. Hocus Pocus made US$39 million in the US, but became a cult film due to strong DVD sales and large television following.

In the 1994 comedy Monkey Trouble, Birch portrayed a girl who adopts a Capuchin monkey trained to pick pockets and burglarize houses. Marjorie Baumgarten, for the Austin Chronicle, observed that her "nuanced performance (a rarity amongst child performers) no doubt lends Monkey Trouble its realistic touch". Also in 1994, she reprised her Patriot Games role in the sequel, Clear and Present Danger, which grossed over US$215 million globally.

In 1995, Birch was cast as the younger version of Melanie Griffith's character in the coming-of-age film Now and Then, also starring Gaby Hoffmann, Christina Ricci, Demi Moore and Rosie O'Donnell. She landed a leading role in the adventure drama Alaska (1996) opposite Vincent Kartheiser, portraying two siblings who search through the Alaskan wilderness for their lost father (Dirk Benedict). For the next two years, she did not appear in a film but guest-starred in Promised Land and Touched by an Angel. She subsequently filmed the made-for-television film Night Ride Home and an uncredited role for Anywhere but Here, both released in 1999.

Also in 1999, she appeared in the Sam Mendes-directed drama American Beauty, as Jane Burnham, the insecure daughter of Kevin Spacey's character. Rolling Stone felt Birch "[glimmered] with grown-up radiance" in her role, for which she later received a BAFTA Award nomination for Best Supporting Actress. The film was the recipient of the Academy Award for Best Picture and grossed over US$356 million worldwide, emerging as the biggest commercial success of Birch's career to date.

2000s
Following her success with American Beauty, she appeared in two films released in 2000. The small-scale drama The Smokers received a straight-to-DVD release in the US, going largely unnoticed, but Birch was called "a scene-stealer" in her supporting role by The Hollywood Reporter. Her other film of the year was the poorly received Dungeons & Dragons, a fantasy film based on the role-playing game of the same name. In 2001, she starred with Keira Knightley in the horror film The Hole, in which her headlining credit and highly publicized seven figure salary was attributed to her appearance in American Beauty. The film was released in theaters in the UK, and on DVD in the US. Writing for Variety magazine, Derek Elley stated that Birch gave "an effectively creepy lead [performance]" in the film, which he called "a clunky British attempt to merge the psychothriller and teen movie genres".

Birch headlined the 2001 black comedy Ghost World, directed by Terry Zwigoff and co-starring Scarlett Johansson, Steve Buscemi and Brad Renfro. The film, focused on the lives of two teenage outsiders (Birch and Johansson) in an unnamed American city, was released in a specialty theatrical run, to a highly favorable critical reception. James Berardinelli found Birch's part to be her "first effectively developed role" since American Beauty and positively singled out the actress for the "quirkiness [and the] underlying sense of melancholy and ennui" in her portrayal. She earned a Golden Globe nomination for Best Actress – Musical or Comedy.

Birch appeared as the title character in the biographical television film Homeless to Harvard: The Liz Murray Story (2003), playing a young woman who, after becoming homeless at 15 amid personal tragedies, begins her work to finish her studies. She garnered acclaim for her part, receiving an Emmy nomination. After her professional achievements in the 1990s and early 2000s, Birch's profile decreased significantly in the next decade, as she had more infrequent acting appearances in much smaller-scale productions. Reflecting on her career trajectory the subsequent years during a January 2014 interview, she attributed it to not "taking" the demands the film industry had for her, opting to "maintain a strong identity and pursue things that were a little more thoughtful, and I guess nobody really wanted women to do that at that time".

Birch appeared in several music videos including Moby's "We Are All Made of Stars", and Limp Bizkit's "Eat You Alive", which also featured Bill Paxton.

She played a supporting role in Silver City, a political satire written and directed by John Sayles, which premiered at the 2004 Cannes Film Festival. In 2006, Birch had the lead role in the horror-thriller Dark Corners, portraying a troubled young woman who wakes up one day as a different person—someone who is stalked by creatures. The film did not receive a theatrical release and instead went straight to DVD. She followed with the female lead role in the 2008 slasher Train.

She appeared in the 2009 psychological thriller Deadline, co-starring Brittany Murphy. Also in 2009, she starred in the independent mystery film Winter of Frozen Dreams, as Barbara Hoffman, a Wisconsin biochemistry student and prostitute convicted of murder in the first ever televised murder trial.

2010s
In 2010, Birch took on the role of Sidney Bloom in the made-for-television movie The Pregnancy Pact, which was based on the 2008 media circus surrounding teenagers in Gloucester, Massachusetts, who allegedly agreed to concurrently give birth and raise their children communally. The Lifetime film was watched by 5.9 million viewers. Later in 2010, Birch was cast and scheduled to make her American stage debut in the off Broadway revival of Dracula, but was fired for the behavior of her father, her manager at the time, who physically threatened one of the show's cast members.

Birch starred in the 2012 independent dramedy Petunia, playing the role of Vivian Petunia. She is credited as a co-producer in the film, which depicts simultaneously the lives and romantic relationships of the Petunia family. Birch considered the film an  "intimate" and "a very modern tale",  describing it as "a little bit different from your standard summer fare". Distributed for a very limited release in the US, the film premiered at Cinema Village in New York City, garnering mixed reviews.

After devoting herself to academic pursuits, Birch returned to her acting career in 2015 with a recurring role as software engineer Morgan in the Carlton Cuse series Colony.

Following the series, Birch first starred in the independent film The Etruscan Smile with Brian Cox, which was shot in San Francisco and Scotland. She then went to Kentucky to shoot the thriller Above Suspicion, based on the book of the same name by New York Times columnist Joe Sharkey, and co-starring Jack Huston, Emilia Clarke and Johnny Knoxville. In 2018, Birch starred in the political thriller Affairs of State, with David Corenswet, Mimi Rogers, and Adrian Grenier. The film was shot in Norfolk, Virginia. Also that year, she starred in the romantic comedy, The Competition, directed by Harvey Lowry, which was shot in Portland. Birch also co-produced the film, which was picked up for distribution by VMI Worldwide. Most recently, Birch appeared in the Plan B and A24 film The Last Black Man in San Francisco, opposite Jimmie Fails, Jonathan Majors, and Danny Glover.

In 2019, Birch started playing the role of Gamma / Mary on the tenth season of The Walking Dead.

2020s

In 2021 Birch starred in the independent film 13 Minutes.

In 2022, Birch made her directorial debut with The Gabby Petito Story for Lifetime; she also co-starred in the film. Birch had previously worked with Lifetime on two films in which she starred.

Personal life 
Birch married talent manager and philanthropist Michael Benton Adler on December 21, 2018. Birch is a long-time Democrat who was a delegate at the 2012 Democratic National Convention. In addition, she has supported Barack Obama, Joe Biden, and local political efforts, such as North Carolina State Senator Wiley Nickel's campaign.

Filmography

Film

Television

Podcasts

Awards and nominations

References

External links 

 
 
 

1982 births
Living people
20th-century American actresses
21st-century American actresses
Actresses from Los Angeles
American child actresses
American film actresses
American people of French-Canadian descent
American people of German-Jewish descent
American people of Italian descent
American people of Scandinavian descent
American television actresses
California Democrats
Outstanding Performance by a Cast in a Motion Picture Screen Actors Guild Award winners